Mantis in Lace is a 1968 sexploitation film directed by William Rotsler and starring Susan Stewart, Vic Lance, Steven Vincent, Pat Barrington, and Stuart Lancaster. It was produced by Harry Novak. At least two differently edited versions have been released, one of which has more emphasis on sex and one of which emphasizes violence. The movie was released under the title, Lila, which coincides with the movie's opening scene also crediting the film's title as Lila.

Plot
"Lila" ‒ played by Susan Stewart ‒ is a seemingly good-natured go-go dancer who strips at a seedy topless bar on the Sunset Strip. After taking LSD, Lila becomes a psychopathic serial killer. She continues to pick up men at the bar where she is employed, but after her sanity is lost she routinely is interrupted mid-coitus by psychedelic bad trips in which she visualizes a balding, half-naked old man clutching wads of cash in one hand and a bunch of bananas in the other. These psychotic episodes cause her to murder her partners by stabbing them with a screwdriver and dismembering them with a rusty meat cleaver (or in one case, a garden hoe) while imagining that she is cutting up cantaloupes and watermelons.

As pieces of the victims' bodies are discovered in cardboard boxes, she is pursued by a pair of Los Angeles Police Department detectives played by Steven Vincent and M.K. Evans. The narrative is interrupted by long sequences of topless dancing, softcore pornography, and recreational drug use.

Cast
Other credited cast members include Vic Lance (as "Tiger" and composer of the film's theme song, "Lila", sung by Lynn Harper), Pat Barrington, Stuart Lancaster, Janu Wine, John Caroll, John LaSalle, Hinton Pope, Bethel Buckalew, Lyn Armondo, Norton Halper, Judith Crane (dancer), and Cheryl Trepton (dancer).

Reviews
Mantis in Lace has been described as "a truly bizarre movie" and "a very strange trip ...(with) lots of tits and little sense"; the review further warns:
The acting is either terrible or nonexistent. The same can be said for the direction and editing. The music score, relying chiefly on an electric guitarist who seems to be making up stuff as he goes along — none of it worthy of the term "improvisation", mind you — lurches from quirky kitsch to agonizing irritant very quickly. The drippy "Lila" theme song, used a gazillion times, should require a warning label on the DVD to prevent mental injury.
Another reviewer warns that after watching this "less than riveting tale" the viewer's "biggest question will be whether you should categorize what you've just seen as a bad trip or merely a bummer".

References

External links

1968 films
American sexploitation films
1960s English-language films
1960s American films